Hemimycena is a genus of fungi in the family Mycenaceae. The genus has a widespread distribution, and according to a 2008 estimate, contains about 50 species. The genus was described by mycologist Rolf Singer in 1938. They lack amyloid reaction in the spores.

Species

H. albicolor
H. amazonica
H. angusta
H. angustispora
H. arctii
H. aurantiaca
H. brevispora
H. candida
H. cephalotricha
H. conidiogena
H. cretacea
H. crispata
H. crispuliformis
H. crispuloides
H. cryptomeriae
H. cucullata
H. cyphelloides
H. delectabilis
H. depauperata
H. diplocystis
H. epibiotica
H. epichloë
H. globulifera
H. gracilis
H. guanacastensis
H. gypsella
H. herrerae
H. hirsuta
H. ignobilis
H. immaculata (Peck) Watling 1998
H. indica
H. juncicola
H. lactea
H. longicystis
H. longipilosa
H. longipleurocystidiata
H. mairei
H. marbleae
H. mauretanica
H. micropapillata
H. minutissima
H. naranjana
H. nebulophila
H. nitriolens
H. nivea
H. nothofagi
H. ochrogaleata
H. patagonica
H. perone
H. persimilis
H. phlomisii
H. pithya
H. pithyophila
H. pleurotiformis
H. praedecurrens
H. pseudoconidiophora
H. pseudocrispata
H. pseudocrispula
H. pseudogibba
H. pseudolactea
H. reducta
H. rickenii
H. seegeri
H. sordida
H. stiriispora
H. subglobispora
H. subimmaculata
H. substellata
H. subtilis
H. subtranslucens
H. subtropicalis
H. tanjae
H. tortuosa
H. truncicola

See also
List of Agaricales genera

References

Mycenaceae
Agaricales genera
Taxa named by Rolf Singer